Thomas William Mostyn Hustler (1934–2006) was a society photographer, who photographed weddings and royalty..

Hustler was born at Acklam Hall, his family's ancestral home in North Yorkshire, England, on 3 October 1934. He was educated at Aysgarth School and Eton College and, from 1952, underwent National Service, during which he saw action against communist insurgents in the Malayan Emergency as a lieutenant in the Somerset Light Infantry.

As a photographer, he took pictures of Prince Charles and Princess Anne for National Savings stamps.

He appeared as a castaway on the BBC Radio programme Desert Island Discs on 31 May 1975.

He died in Wokingham, Berkshire on 24 July 2006.

Bibliography

References 

1934 births
2006 deaths
Place of death missing
Photographers from Yorkshire
People educated at Aysgarth School
People from Middlesbrough
People educated at Eton College
Somerset Light Infantry officers
British Army personnel of the Malayan Emergency